Edward Evelyn Greaves (19 April 1940 - 22 September 2018) was High Commissioner of Barbados to Canada ( from July 2008). He was a representative for the constituency of St. Lucy (1971–1981) and (1986–1994).

Family and education
Edward Evelyn Greaves was born at Pie Corner in the Parish of St. Lucy in the Island of Barbados on 19 April 1940. He received his early education at St. Clement’s Boys’ School and his secondary education at the Coleridge and Parry School and Harrison College. Greaves graduated from the University of the West Indies (Cave Hill Campus) with an honours degree in history and economics (1967) and from Rutgers, the State University of New Jersey, U.S., with a master's degree in education (Labor Studies- 1971).

High Commission of Barbados, Ottawa
Greaves is the current Barbados government representative and High Commissioner to Canada. He replaced Glyne Samuel Hyvesta Murray. He was invited to serve as High Commissioner of Barbados to Canada by the newly elected prime minister of Barbados, David Thompson.

Accreditation
The Barbadian High Commissioner in Ottawa is also concurrently accredited as non-resident ambassador to Australia and New Zealand.

Personal life
Edward Evelyn Greaves is married to Julia Francilia Greaves and has two children: Stacey Greaves and  Lauralynn Greaves.

See also 

 Barbados–Canada relations
 Canadian High Commission in Barbados
 High Commission of Barbados, Ottawa
 List of Ambassadors and High Commissioners to Canada

References

External links

Members of the House of Assembly of Barbados
1940 births
2018 deaths
High Commissioners of Barbados to Australia
High Commissioners of Barbados to Canada
High Commissioners of Barbados to New Zealand